The 66th Berlin International Film Festival was held from 11 to 21 February 2016, with American actress Meryl Streep as the President of the Jury. The Honorary Golden Bear for lifetime achievement was presented to German cinematographer Michael Ballhaus. Hail, Caesar!, directed by Joel and Ethan Coen, was selected to open the festival. The Golden Bear was awarded to the Italian documentary Fire at Sea, directed by Gianfranco Rosi, which also serves as closing night film.

Jury

Main Competition
The following people were on the jury for the Berlinale Competition section:

International jury
 Meryl Streep, actress (United States) - Jury President
 Lars Eidinger, actor (Germany)
 Nick James, film critic (United Kingdom)
 Brigitte Lacombe, photographer (France)
 Clive Owen, actor (United Kingdom)
 Alba Rohrwacher, actress (Italy)
 Małgorzata Szumowska, director and screenwriter (Poland)

Best First Feature Award Jury
The following people were on the jury for the Best First Feature Award:
 Michel Franco, film director and producer (Mexico)
 Enrico Lo Verso, actor (Italy)
 Ursula Meier, film director (Switzerland)

International Short Film Jury
The following people were on the jury for the Berlinale Shorts section:
 Sheikha Hoor Al-Qasimi, curator, artist and lecturer (United Arab Emirates)
 Katerina Gregos, curator, writer and lecturer (Greece)
 Avi Mograbi, filmmaker, video artist and lecturer (Israel)

In competition
The following films were selected for the main competition for the Golden Bear and Silver Bear awards:

Out of competition
The following films were selected to be screened out of competition:

Panorama
The following films were selected for the Panorama section:

Panorama Dokumente
The following films were selected for the Panorama Dokumente section:

Teddy30
The following films were selected to be screened as part of Teddy Award's 30th anniversary celebration:

Berlinale Special
The following films were selected for the Berlinale Special section:

Awards

The following prizes were awarded:
 Golden Bear: Fire at Sea by Gianfranco Rosi
 Honorary Golden Bear: Michael Ballhaus
 Silver Bear Grand Jury Prize: Death in Sarajevo by Danis Tanović
 Alfred Bauer Prize (Silver Bear): A Lullaby to the Sorrowful Mystery by Lav Diaz
 Silver Bear for Best Director: Mia Hansen-Løve for Things to Come
 Silver Bear for Best Actress: Trine Dyrholm for The Commune
 Silver Bear for Best Actor: Majd Mastoura for Hedi
 Silver Bear for Best Script: Tomasz Wasilewski for United States of Love
 Silver Bear for Outstanding Artistic Contribution for Cinematography: Mark Lee Ping Bin for Crosscurrent
 Best First Feature Award: Mohamed Ben Attia for Hedi
 Panoroma Audience Award:
 1st Place: Junction 48 by Udi Aloni
 2nd Place: Greetings from Fukushima by Doris Dörrie
 3rd Place: Shepherds and Butchers by Oliver Schmitz
 Panoroma Audience Award – Documentaries (Panorama Dokumente):
 1st Place: Who's Gonna Love Me Now? by Tomer and Barak Heymann
 2nd Place: Strike a Pose by Reijer Zwaan and Ester Gold
 3rd Place: Weekends by Lee Dong-ha
 Golden Bear For Best Short Film: Batrachian's Ballad by Leonor Teles
 Silver Bear Jury Prize (short film): A Man Returned  by Mahdi Fleifel
 Audi Short Film Award: Anchorage Prohibited by Chiang Wei Liang
 Teddy Award:
 Best Feature Film: Tomcat by Händl Klaus
 Best Documentary/Essay Film: Kiki by Sara Jordenö
 Best Short Film: Moms On Fire by Joanna Rytel
 Special Jury Award: You'll Never Be Alone by Alex Anwandter
 Special Teddy Award: Christine Vachon
 Teddy Audience Award: Paris 05:59 by Jacques Martineau and Olivier Ducastel
 Männer Magazine Readers' Jury Award: Don't Call Me Son by Anna Muylaert
 FIPRESCI Prize:
 Competition: Death in Sarajevo by Danis Tanović
 Panorama: Aloys by Tobias Nölle
 Forum: The Revolution Won't Be Televised by Rama Thiaw
 Prize of the Ecumenical Jury:
 Competition: Fire at Sea by Gianfranco Rosi
 Panorama: The First, the Last by Bouli Lanners
 Forum:
 Barakah Meets Barakah by Mahmoud Sabbagh
 Those Who Jump by Abou Bakar Sidibé, Estephan Wagner and Moritz Sieber
 Europa Cinemas Label: The First, the Last by Bouli Lanners
 Arte International Prize: Alvaro Brechner for Memories from the Cell
 Eurimages Co-production Development Award: Cinéma De facto and Proton Cinema for Blind Willow, Sleeping Woman

References

External links

Berlin International Film Festival

2016 festivals in Europe
2016 film festivals
2016 in Berlin
66
February 2016 events in Germany
2016 in German cinema